Zeina Adra ( Akar; ; born  1964) is a Lebanese politician who served as the Defence Minister and Deputy Prime Minister of Lebanon from 21 January 2020 to 10 September 2021. She was the first female defence minister in the Arab world.

Early life and career 
Zeina Akar was born in Koura. She has a bachelor's degree in marketing and management from the Lebanese American University.  In 1998, she and her husband founded the Social and Cultural Development Association (INMA), a development NGO to provide educational, health and economic services in Kefraya and Lebanon. She was the executive director of the research and consultancy firm "Information International", which was founded by her husband.

Political career 
Akar was appointed Defense Minister and Deputy Prime Minister in January 2020, one of six women appointed to the twenty member Cabinet in the new government headed by Prime Minister Hassan Diab. She is the country's first female defence minister, and the first female defence minister in the Arab world. The appointment of the six women to Lebanon's Cabinet was met with "an outpouring amount of comments, memes, and jokes sexualizing and objectifying them". However, this was rectified at a later stage where Zeina Akar was complimented for having outstanding  managerial and organizational skills.

Akar has no military or defense background. When asked about her appointment, Diab questioned the need to have specialists for the job. She has been accused of being affiliated with various political parties, but sources denied this saying she has no partisan background and was chosen by President Michel Aoun. Lawyer Imad al-Hout said "It is clear that the choice of ministers, including the defense minister, was not based primarily on efficiency but on loyalty." The Cabinet as a whole has been called "technocratic".

At the handover ceremony on 23 January 2020, Akar spoke about the right of the people to protest and pressure the government and the government's responsibility to act in the people's best interests. She said her priority was fighting corruption and asked people to watch she would do before judging her. Following the explosion in Beirut on 4 August 2020, Hassan Diab's Government resigned on 10 August and Akar will have the function of a caretaker of the Ministry until a replacing Government is constituted.

Personal life 
Akar is Greek Orthodox. She is married to Jawad Adra, a Sunni businessman who heads one of the country's largest research companies, and built the Nabu Museum with artefacts mostly from his private collection. They were married in Cyprus as they could not have a civil marriage in Lebanon as a Christian and a Muslim.

References

External links

21st-century Lebanese women politicians
21st-century Lebanese politicians
1964 births
Living people
Deputy prime ministers of Lebanon
Female defence ministers
Free Patriotic Movement politicians
Defense ministers of Lebanon
Greek Orthodox Christians from Lebanon
Lebanese American University alumni
Lebanese social scientists
People from Koura District
Women government ministers of Lebanon